Sir Joseph Compton-Rickett, DL PC (13 February 1847 – 30 July 1919), was a British Liberal Party politician. He was also an industrialist (until 1902), lay preacher, and writer. He wrote poetry and fiction, as well as on such topics as popular philosophy. He sometimes wrote under the pseudonym Maurice Baxter.

Background
He was born in London as Joseph Rickett, the eldest son of Joseph Rickett, of East Hoathly. He was educated at King Edward VI School, Bath. In 1868 he married Catharine Sarah Gamble (1847–1933). They had ten children. There were four sons and four daughters living when he died in 1919. He was knighted on 24 December 1907. He assumed by Royal licence the additional surname of Compton in 1908.

In 1911 he was appointed to the Privy Council.

Professional career
He was in business and interested in various commercial undertakings. In 1902, he retired from the chairmanship of several coal trade companies to devote himself to his political career.

Political career

He was Member of Parliament (MP) for Scarborough from 1895–1906. He had gained the seat from the Conservatives in 1895 and held it in 1900. He was then Member of Parliament for Osgoldcross from 1906–1918. In 1906 he re-gained the seat that had been Independent Liberal since 1899. He held office in the Coalition Government of David Lloyd George as Paymaster-General from 1916 to 1919. In 1917 he served as a Charity Commissioner.

He was Member of Parliament for the Pontefract constituency that largely absorbed Osgoldcross from 1918 until his death aged 72 the following year. For the execution of his will, Sir Joseph's eldest son, Arthur Compton-Rickett, was appointed the public trustee.

Electoral record

References

External links
 

1847 births
1919 deaths
Knights Bachelor
British poets
British Christians
Liberal Party (UK) MPs for English constituencies
UK MPs 1895–1900
UK MPs 1900–1906
UK MPs 1906–1910
UK MPs 1910
UK MPs 1910–1918
UK MPs 1918–1922
People educated at King Edward's School, Bath
Members of the Privy Council of the United Kingdom
19th-century British businesspeople